Humberto Tati Santiesteban (November 3, 1934 – October 29, 2020) was an American politician from Texas.

Early life and education
Santiesteban was born in El Paso, Texas, and went to New Mexico Military Institute. He served in the United States Army and was commissioned a first lieutenant. He attended the University of Texas School of Law.

Career
Santiesteban practiced law in El Paso. He served in the Texas House of Representatives from district 67-1 from 1967 to 1973 and in the Texas Senate from the 29th district from 1973 to 1991.

Death
Santiesteban died from COVID-19 in El Paso on October 29, 2020, at age 85, during the COVID-19 pandemic in Texas.

References

1934 births
2020 deaths
Democratic Party members of the Texas House of Representatives
Democratic Party Texas state senators
Deaths from the COVID-19 pandemic in Texas
Texas lawyers
Politicians from El Paso, Texas
Military personnel from Texas
New Mexico Military Institute alumni
University of Texas School of Law alumni
20th-century American politicians